As a professional baseball player, Roberto Clemente is considered one of Puerto Rico’s most important players and became the first Latin American to enter the National Baseball Hall of Fame and Museum. As a civilian, he became known for his philanthropic activities and for being outspoken in civic issues that affected the Hispanic and black communities. In both of these facets, Clemente left a long lasting legacy that remains socially relevant and the subject of academic study and recognitions fifty years after his death.

Accolades
 Dr. Martin Luther King Jr., speaking on July 9, 1961 with Pittsburgh Post-Gazette sports editor Al Abrams, said "They are honoring a great one in Clemente. I have been watching his career ever since he joined the Pittsburgh club. Roberto should wind up as one of the all-time stars before he is through."
 Willie Mays, while fielding questions from reporters following the announcement of his election to the Hall of Fame on January 23, 1979, called Clemente the best player he ever saw, other than himself. Mays reiterated his assessment of Clemente on January 26, 1979, stating that, "He could do anything with a bat and in the field." Mays has repeatedly through the years stood by his statements regarding Clemente.

 Barry Bonds, speaking in 1992, told the Pittsburgh Tribune-Review, "When I’m done, I want people to say, 'He’s the best.' Right field belongs to Roberto Clemente, center field belongs to Willie Mays. I want left field to belong to me."
 Sandy Koufax, interviewed shortly after the selection of MLB's All-Century Team (from which Clemente was conspicuously absent), was asked to assess fellow honorees. Dubbing Mays the greatest player he'd ever seen and Aaron the greatest hitter, Koufax said that this "raises the question of where you put Clemente; he's right there." This is consistent with Koufax's 1965 magazine article ranking Clemente just behind Aaron at the top of his "toughest batter" list, while also emphasizing the former's immense power. "The longest ball I ever saw hit to the opposite field was hit off me by Clemente at the Los Angeles Coliseum in 1961. It was a fastball on the outside corner, and he drove it out of the park – not just over the fence, he knocked it way out. I didn’t think a right-handed batter could hit it out of the field just at that point but Clemente did." Moreover, it appears that, by his own estimation, the longest blast ever yielded by Koufax in any direction was launched by Clemente at Forbes Field on May 31, 1964.
 Duke Snider wrote that "Carl Furillo was the best right fielder I ever saw until Roberto Clemente came along, and Clemente was possibly the best ballplayer I’ve ever seen. And just think that we could have had Clemente in our outfield."
 Sparky Anderson, in his eponymous 1990 memoir, writes, "Walking away… Roberto Clemente is my premier outfielder – period. I saw more of Clemente than I wanted to when I managed against him. He could hit for power when he had to. When he wanted to slap it to right, he shot the ball like a bullet. Plus, he could fly. When he hit a ground ball to the infield, he was flying to first. That fielder better not be napping. Clemente was a remarkable man because at the ages of thirty-four and thirty-five, he played like he was twenty-one. I never saw anything like it. [...] That’s how I’ll always remember him – as a man who played with youthful energy."
 Dave Bristol (Anderson's predecessor as Reds' manager), speaking in May 1967, said "The best player in the game today. I’d have to take him over Aaron and all the rest. [...] I've only been in the league a little over a year and a half, but I don't think I've ever seen him make an easy out." Quoted in September 1969, Bristol reiterated, "Clemente is the best player I’ve ever seen. I said so when I first came into the league and I still say so."
 Paul Richards, taking part in a poll of MLB general managers at the 1967 winter meetings (speaking as the then-Atlanta Braves GM), said, "I don’t know how a man can be running away from the ball and hit it into the upper deck. I shudder to think what he would do if he stood at the plate on every pitch and defied the pitcher to pitch to him. Clemente’s a one-man show as far as I’m concerned. He’s not only the best today; he’s one of the best that’s ever played baseball. He’s got power, and he’s so fast that any bouncing ball is a potential base hit. He can hit the ball into the upper deck in anybody’s ballpark – right field or left field. He’s got one of the strongest and most accurate throwing arms I’ve ever seen. He can throw from the most awkward and seemingly impossible positions. He can throw people out at second base on balls that would be triples to any other right fielder. And the thing about this fellow is that he actually breaks many of the fundamental rules of hitting. Many times he sticks his fanny out – but he still manages to hit the ball with authority. To me he is one of the most amazing athletes of all time." 
 Lou Boudreau, speaking in 1964, said that Clemente was "one of the worst-looking great hitters I’ve seen. Everything is a line drive. There isn’t one phase of baseball in which he doesn’t excel."
 Lou Brock, speaking with reporters in June 1967, explained, "I'm looking at the best hitter in baseball," in response to queries regarding the "rapt attention" he had given one of Clemente's at-bats. In July 1980, Brock told The New Pittsburgh Courier, "Willie Mays was the greatest player I ever saw. Clemente was second and Hank Aaron was the greatest slugger. But pound for pound, play-for-play, Willie Mays could do it all well. You can name four or five in what I call that elite category."  
 Clete Boyer, circa 2002, said that Clemente was "by far the greatest defensive right fielder who ever lived, but because he played in Pittsburgh, he didn't get the credit he deserved. I played with Roger Maris and against Al Kaline, and they were both great right fielders. But they weren't in Clemente's class."
 Smoky Burgess, looking back in 1978 at his long MLB career, told former Pittsburgh Press sports editor Les Biederman, "The one player who impressed me the most was Roberto Clemente, both as a man and as an athlete. He was one of the nicest individuals and just tremendous as a ball player. I never saw a better player, although I always regarded Ted Williams as the best hitter."
 Tommy John considered Clemente one of the most difficult hitters he ever faced as a pitcher. "He hit the same way I pitched: with his head, outthinking you."
 Tom Seaver, speaking with Phil Pepe, circa 1997, said, "I had a kind of dual relationship with a Roberto Clemente, a Henry Aaron, a Willie Mays. You watch them and you appreciate their professional approach and their God-given expertise of the game. Then you're competing against them. [...] Clemente and Mays and Aaron. These are the guys who, when you weren’t pitching, you just sat there and watched them play, watched what they did. Anybody who watched the ball when Willie Mays was on the field was crazy. And Clemente was very much the same."

 Rusty Staub, speaking in April 1968, said, "Clemente has fantastic power, fantastic speed, a fantastic ability to hit the ball to the opposite field, a fantastic arm – he is the complete ballplayer. Roberto is not merely good at everything, but great at everything. He just beats you, and beats you at everything you can do in baseball. I know of no other player comparable to him." Interviewed in the fall of 1971, Staub added, "Clemente is the greatest defensive outfielder I've ever seen. I’ve never been on his ball club and I don’t know what he’s like as a team player, but this guy can do just everything to beat you – run, hit, throw, catch, and just kill you with power. He’s the best player I’ve seen in the big leagues."
 Coot Veal, one of Clemente's teammates on the 1960 Pirates, told Danny Peary, "There were many guys on the Pirates who had leadership qualities: Roberto Clemente, Dick Groat, Don Hoak, Vernon Law, even Smoky Burgess. Clemente led with his play. There wasn’t a better player than Roberto Clemente. Clemente, Mantle and Kaline were the best all-around players I ever saw, and I think Clemente was the best."<ref>Peary, Danny, editor (1994). We Played the Game: 65 Players Remember Baseball's Greatest Era. New York: Hyperion. .</ref>
 Eddie Yost, baseball's onetime "Walking Man", when asked to name the best players of his era, replied, "Yogi... and all the Yankees, for that matter. But I saw Clemente when I was coaching for the Mets. I believe he was the best I saw."
 Dick Young, following Game 3 of the 1971 World Series, wrote, "The best damn ballplayer in the World Series – maybe in the whole world – is Roberto Clemente and, as far as I’m concerned, they can give him the automobile right now. Maybe some guys hit the ball farther, and some throw it harder, and one or two run faster, although I doubt that, but nobody puts it all together like Roberto. [...] Clemente is a 37-year-old roadrunner. He has spent 18 summers of those years playing baseball for the Pittsburgh Pirates. He has batted over .300 thirteen times, and for the last three seasons, in his decrepitude, he has hit .345, .352, .341. But everybody has numbers. Don’t mind the numbers. Just watch how Roberto Clemente runs 90 feet the next time he hits the ball back to the pitcher and ask yourself if you work at your job that way. Every time I see Roberto Clemente play ball, I think of the times I’ve heard about how ‘they’ dog it, and I want to vomit." 
 Named a member of MLB's Latino Legends Team in 2005.
 Selected for the All Time Rawlings Gold Glove Team in August 2007 for the 50th anniversary of the award.
 In 1999, Clemente ranked number 20 on The Sporting News list of the 100 Greatest Baseball Players, the highest-ranking Latin American and Caribbean player on the list. Later that year, Clemente was nominated as a finalist for the Major League Baseball All-Century Team.

Biographies and documentaries
Clemente's life has been the subject of numerous books, articles, and documentaries:

1968, 1973: Roberto Clemente, Batting King by Arnold Hano"Arnold Hano's Paperback Edition, 'Roberto Clemente, Batting King'". The Indiana Gazette. May 26, 1973. p. 7.

1973: Roberto Clemente by Ira Miller (UPI)

1973: "Numero Uno" Roberto! by Bill Christine

1973: Clemente! by Kal Wagenheim

1973: A Touch Of Royalty, a documentary narrated in English and Spanish versions by Puerto Rican Academy Award winner actor José Ferrer.

1973: Olu Clemente — The Philosopher of Baseball, a bilingual play featuring poetry, music and dancing, by Miguel Algarin and Jesús Abraham Laviera, performed on August 30, 1973, at the Delacorte Theatre, Central Park, and published in 1979 in Nuevos pasos: Chicano and Puerto Rican drama by Nicolás Kanellos and Jorge A. Huerta.

1974: Who Was Roberto? A Biography of Roberto Clemente by Phil Musick 

1993:  Roberto Clemente: A Video Tribute to One of Baseball's Greatest Players and a True Humanitarian, documentary directed by Rich Domich and Michael Kostel, narrated by Puerto Rican actors Raul Julia (in Spanish) and Héctor Elizondo (in English).

2006: Clemente: The Passion and Grace of Baseball's Last Hero by David Maraniss.

2008: "Roberto Clemente": One-hour biography as part of the Public Broadcasting Service history series, American Experience which premiered on April 21, 2008. The film is directed by Bernardo Ruiz, narrated by Jimmy Smits and features interviews with Vera Clemente, Orlando Cepeda and George F. Will. The production received an ALMA Award.

2010: Chasing 3000 a movie based on a true story of two kids who travel from Los Angeles to Pittsburgh hoping to see Clemente's 3,000th hit.

2011: 21: The Story of Roberto Clemente was released, a graphic novel by Wilfred Santiago (published by Fantagraphics) detailing Clemente's life in a comic-book format. In their USA Today Magazine article titled "Saluting Pittsburgh's Finest" Richard E. Vatz and Lee S. Weinberg said Clemente was "arguably the best in the history of the game" and stated that "understanding the magnitude of Roberto Clemente requires an appreciation of the gestalt of his presence, which was greater than the sum of his statistics".

2011: DC-7: The Roberto Clemente Story, a bilingual musical about Clemente's life, had its world premiere in November 2011 with a full house at the Teatro SEA in Manhattan before moving to New York's Puerto Rican Traveling Theatre for a successful seven-week run. The show ran from December 6 through December 16, 2012 at Puerto Rico's Teatro Francisco Arrivi.

2013: Baseball's Last Hero: 21 Clemente Stories, the first feature dramatic film on Clemente's life was finished by California filmmaker and Pittsburgh native Richard Rossi. Rossi returned to Pittsburgh to premiere his film on Roberto Clemente's birthday, August 18, 2013  before exhibiting the film in New York, other cities, and DVD.

 Influence on players today 

Roberto Clemente's influence on Puerto Rican baseball players was very similar to that of Jackie Robinson for African American baseball players. While he was not the first Puerto Rican to play in Major League Baseball, he was arguably the most notable to play in his time; As with Robinson, Clemente faced discrimination and disrespect while playing in MLB.

MLB shortstop Carlos Correa has shared what he admired most about Clemente as a player: "The passion, the way he played, the way he went about his business every single day. Every time he put on his uniform he felt like the luckiest man in the world so that for me is what I admire most.

Veneration
For his philanthropic tendencies and the noble circumstances behind his death, Clemente has become widely respected and has socially transcended in his native Puerto Rico to the point of being considered a secular saint by academics. With time, his public perception has evolved into what has been called a modern-day “myth”, having achieved a type of “immortality” as his figure became an “incorruptible […] symbol” of hope.

Catholic canonization effort

The feature film Baseball's Last Hero: 21 Clemente Stories'' (2013) was filmed by Richard Rossi.  One of the scenes in the movie features a conversation Clemente has with a nun.

The scene spurred Rossi, a former evangelical minister, to submit a request to the Holy See to consider Clemente's canonization as a saint. The Congregation for the Causes of Saints, responsible for these issues, responded by confirming receipt of the letter and directing Rossi to work through the Archbishop of San Juanthe jurisdiction in which Clemente died; Rossi issued a press release showing a picture of the response and said that it showed that the Pope was personally supporting Rossi's effort.

Rossi received positive comments from the executive director of the Clemente Museum in Pittsburgh, while Carmen Nanko-Fernandez, from the Chicago Theological Union, was not confident that Clemente would be canonized, saying that Hispanic Catholics can continue to privately venerate Clemente. Neil Walker, a Roman Catholic whose father was a teammate of Clemente, stated that "he's somebody who lived his life serving others, really. So if it would happen, I wouldn't be terribly surprised by it."

In July 2017, Rossi said that the canonization requirement of a miracle was met that month when Jamie Nieto, who played Clemente in Rossi's film and was paralyzed from the neck down in a backflip accident three years after the Clemente film was released, walked 130 steps at his own wedding to fellow Olympian Shevon Stoddart; Nieto stated that the success was due to his hard work, and the Holy See stated that they were not in continued contact with Rossi.

References
Footnotes

Notes

Roberto Clemente